Chrosomus is a genus of small cyprinid fish found in freshwater habitats in the eastern half of the United States and Canada. There are currently seven recognized species in this genus. They have sometimes been included in Phoxinus. They are the only members of the predominantly western subfamily Laviniinae that are found in eastern North America.

Species
 Chrosomus cumberlandensis (W. C. Starnes & L. B. Starnes, 1978) (Blackside dace)
 Chrosomus eos Cope, 1861 (Northern redbelly dace)
 Chrosomus erythrogaster Rafinesque, 1820 (Southern redbelly dace)
 Chrosomus neogaeus (Cope, 1867) (Finescale dace)
 Chrosomus oreas Cope, 1868 (Mountain redbelly dace)
 Chrosomus saylori (Skelton, 2001) (Laurel dace)
 Chrosomus tennesseensis (W. C. Starnes & R. E. Jenkins, 1988) (Tennessee dace)

References

 

 
Fish of North America
Taxa named by Constantine Samuel Rafinesque